The Fire This Time is a live album by Lester Bowie's Brass Fantasy recorded in Aarburg, Switzerland for the In & Out label. It is the seventh album by Bowie's Brass Fantasy group and features performances by Bowie, Vincent Chancey, Frank Lacy, Louis Bonilla, E. J. Allen, Gerald Brezel, Tony Barrero, Bob Stewart, Vinnie Johnson and Famoudou Don Moye.

Reception
The Allmusic review by Michael G. Nastos awarded the album 4 stars calling it "one of the most important in the Brass Fantasy's history and development".

Track listing
 "Night Time (Is the Right Time)" (Herman) - 2:54  
 "For Louis" (Wilson) - 7:13  
 "Journey Towards Freedom" (Allen) - 10:55  
 "Remember the Time" (Jackson) - 8:32  
 "Strange Fruit" (Allan) - 9:15  
 "Siesta for the Fiesta" (Lunceford) - 4:14  
 "Night Life" (Purse) - 10:29  
 "Black or White" (Jackson) - 7:19  
 "Three for the Festival" (Kirk) - 6:06  
 "The Great Pretender" (Ram) - 7:33  
Recorded live on 1 May 1992 at the Moonwalker Club, Aarburg, Switzerland

Personnel
Lester Bowie: trumpet
Vincent Chancey: French horn
Frank Lacy: trombone
Luis Bonilla: trombone 
E. J. Allen: trumpet
Gerald Brezel: trumpet 
Tony Barrero: trumpet
Bob Stewart: tuba
Famoudou Don Moye: percussion
Vinnie Johnson: drums

References

Lester Bowie live albums
1992 live albums